DWAQ (107.5 FM), broadcasting as Good News Radio 107.5, is a radio station owned and operated by the University of Santo Tomas - Legazpi (formerly Aquinas University of Legaspi). Its studios are located along Tabaco-Legazpi Rd., Brgy. Rawis, Legazpi, Albay, and its transmitter is located at AQ Peak, Brgy. Taysan, Legazpi, Albay.

The station is being used as a laboratory for the Mass Media Communication students of the university and the students of Electronics Communication Engineering, with programming that includes music programs, religious programs, informative segments and talk shows to announce Good News. It serves as the community radio station of UST Legaspi campus, which has also become the bastion of proclaiming the Good News of Christ and inspiring people.

References

Radio stations in Legazpi, Albay
Radio stations established in 2015
College radio stations in the Philippines